was a Japanese politician of the Liberal Democratic Party, a member of the House of Representatives in the Diet (national legislature). A native of Misaka, Yamanashi and graduate of Keio University, he was elected to the House of Representatives for the first time in 1976. He joined Sosuke Uno's cabinet as the Minister of Labour.

References 
 

1930 births
2016 deaths
Ministers of Labour of Japan
Members of the House of Representatives (Japan)
Japanese businesspeople
Keio University alumni
Politicians from Yamanashi Prefecture
Liberal Democratic Party (Japan) politicians
21st-century Japanese politicians